Frank Bayes (21 July 1886 – 24 March 1950) was a South African cricketer. He played in five first-class matches for Eastern Province from 1906/07 to 1908/09.

See also
 List of Eastern Province representative cricketers

References

External links
 

1886 births
1950 deaths
South African cricketers
Eastern Province cricketers
People from Makhanda, Eastern Cape
Cricketers from the Eastern Cape